Francisco Urroz (born 7 September 1993) is a Chilean rugby union player, currently playing for Súper Liga Americana de Rugby side Selknam. His preferred position is fly-half.

Professional career
Urroz signed for Súper Liga Americana de Rugby side Selknam ahead of the 2020 Súper Liga Americana de Rugby season, and re-signed ahead of the 2022 Súper Liga Americana de Rugby season. He had previously played for both the Chile national side and the Chile Sevens side.

References

External links
itsrugby.co.uk Profile

1993 births
Living people
Chilean rugby union players
Rugby union fly-halves
Selknam (rugby union) players
Chile international rugby union players